Rudolf Rudolfovich Frentz (23 July 1888 – 27 December 1956) was a Soviet and Russian painter, watercolorist, graphic artist, illustrator and art teacher who lived and worked in Leningrad. He was a member of the Leningrad Union of Artists and one of the founders of the Leningrad school of painting, most famous for his battle and monumental painting.

Biography

Frentz was born on 23 July 1888 in Marienburg, a suburb of Saint Petersburg, in the Saint Petersburg Governorate of the Russian Empire.

Initially he learned from his father Rudolf Ferdinandovich Frentz (1831–1918), Academic of painting (1912), well-known Russian master of animal and hunting paintings.

In 1918 Rudolf Frentz graduated from Higher Art School at the Imperial Academy of Arts in Saint Petersburg, where he studied noted battle painters Vasily Savinsky and Nikolai Samokysh.

Since 1904 Rudolf Frentz participated in Art Exhibitions. He painted battle scenes, genre and historical paintings, portraits, landscapes, and cityscapes, the most famous being his battle and animal paintings. Among his most famous paintings were ″On Znamenskaya Square in the February days of 1917″ (1917), ″Kryukov Channel″ (1920), ″Still Life″, ″Roadhog″ (both 1921), ″Carousel″ (1922), ″Nevsky Prospekt in the Night. A Cabman″, ″A Folk festivitie″ (both 1923), ″The storming of the Winter Palace″, ″Horsewoman″ (both 1925), ″A Portrait of wife″ (1926), ″The defense of Petrograd from Yudenich″ (1928), ″Sergey Kirov at the May Day Parade″, ″A Workers of the Southern Urals join a Blucher's partisan detachment″ (1929), ″Storm of Kronstadt″ (1935), ″Sergey Kirov in the North Caucasus″, ″Joint actions of tanks, aircraft and cavalry. Combined attack″ (both 1937), ″Mikhail Frunze manages the crossing over Sivash″ (1940), ″Guerrilla paths″ (1947), ″Stalingrad. February 2, 1943'″ (1950).

Rudolf Frentz was a founding member of the Leningrad Union of Artists established in 1932. From 1929 to 1956, he taught at the Repin Institute of Arts, where he was professor of painting (1939–1956) and the head of the battle-painting workshop (from 1934). From 1949 to 1956, he also was professor of painting at the Vera Mukhina Institute, also known as the Leningrad Higher School of Industrial Art. Among his pupils were well-known Russian painters Mikhail Kaneev, Vladislav Anisovich, Nikolai Galakhov, Yuri Belov, Stepan Privedentsev, Sergei Babkov, Alexander Koroviakov, Gevork Kotiantz, Boris Lavrenko, Konstantin Molteninov, Dmitry Oboznenko, Vladimir Ovchinnikov, Nikolai Ovchinnikov, Alexander Pushnin, Vladimir Seleznev, Piotr Litvinsky, Piotr Nazarov and Elena Skuin.

Exhibitions of his works have been held in Leningrad (1928, 1970) and Saint Petersburg (2006).

Rudolf Rudolfovich Frentz died in Leningrad on 27 December 1956. His paintings are held in the State Russian Museum, the State Tretyakov Gallery, and in art museums and private collections in Russia, Italy, France, the US, Germany, England, and elsewhere.

 See also 

 Fine Art of Leningrad
 Leningrad School of Painting
 List of painters of Saint Petersburg Union of Artists
 Saint Petersburg Union of Artists

References

Bibliography
 Выставка художника Р. Р. Френца. Апрель-май. Каталог. Л., Община художников. 1928.
 Выставка лучших произведений советских художников. Путеводитель. — М: Государственная Третьяковская галерея, 1941.
 Седьмая выставка произведений ленинградских художников 1941 года. Каталог. — Л: ЛССХ, 1941.
 Выставка «Героическое прошлое русской армии». Краткий путеводитель. — Новосибирск: Издание Окружного Дома Красной Армии, 1943.
 Выставка произведений ленинградских художников 1947 года. Каталог. — Л: ЛОСХ, 1948.
 Бойков В. Изобразительное искусство Ленинграда. Заметки о выставке ленинградских художников. // Ленинградская правда, 1947, 29 ноября.
 Всесоюзная художественная выставка 1947 года. Каталог. — М-Л: Комитет по делам искусств при СМ СССР, 1947.
 Художественная выставка 1950 года. Живопись. Скульптура. Графика. Каталог. — М: Советский художник, 1950. — с.69.
 Выставка произведений ленинградских художников 1951 года. Каталог. — Л: Лениздат, 1951. — с.21.
 Выставка произведений ленинградских художников 1951 года. Каталог. - Л—М: Искусство, 1951. - с.22.
 Весенняя выставка произведений ленинградских художников. — Л: ЛССХ, 1953. — с.8.
 Рудольф Рудольфович Френц. Каталог выставки. Л., Художник РСФСР, 1970.
 Выставки советского изобразительного искусства. Справочник. Том 3. 1941—1947 годы. — М: Советский художник, 1973. — с.8, 25, 136, 219, 264, 335, 339, 342, 343, 358.
 Изобразительное искусство Ленинграда. Каталог выставки. — Л: Художник РСФСР, 1976. — с.33.
 Выставка произведений ленинградских художников, посвященная 60-летию Великого Октября. — Л: Художник РСФСР, 1982. — с.7.
 Петербург — Петроград — Ленинград в произведениях русских и советских художников. Каталог выставки. - Л: Художник РСФСР, 1980. - с.139.
 Выставки советского изобразительного искусства. Справочник. Том 5. 1954—1958 годы. — М: Советский художник, 1981. — с.41, 382, 519.
 Связь времен. 1932—1997. Художники — члены Санкт — Петербургского Союза художников России. Каталог выставки. — Санкт-Петербург: ЦВЗ «Манеж», 1997. — с.300.
 Matthew C. Bown. Dictionary of 20th Century Russian and Soviet Painters 1900-1980s. - London: Izomar, 1998. , .
 Rudolf Frentz. Saint Petersburg, Palace Editions, 2005. .
 Sergei V. Ivanov. Unknown Socialist Realism. The Leningrad School. Saint Petersburg, NP-Print Edition, 2007. РР.10, 12-14, 19, 20, 357, 359, 361, 363—367, 369, 372, 380—385, 387—389, 392, 399, 405, 407, 439—440. , .
 Данилова А. Становление ленинградской школы живописи и ее художественные традиции // Петербургские искусствоведческие тетради. Вып. 21. СПб, 2011. С. 94—105.
 Санкт-Петербургская государственная художественно-промышленная академия им. А. Л. Штиглица. Кафедра монументально-декоративной живописи.'' СПб., Искусство России. 2011. С. 68.

1888 births
1956 deaths
20th-century Russian painters
Russian male painters
Soviet painters
Russian watercolorists
Socialist realist artists
Members of the Leningrad Union of Artists
Leningrad School artists
Imperial Academy of Arts alumni
20th-century Russian male artists